Monsters and Robots is Buckethead's fifth studio album, released April 20, 1999, by Higher Octave records. A large part of the album was co-written with Les Claypool, who also plays bass on several tracks and lends his vocals to the track "The Ballad of Buckethead".

Buckethead promoted the album by opening for Primus in October and November 1999. Monsters and Robots is listed in the German National Library's catalog and is Buckethead's best selling solo album to date.

Track listing

Notes 
 The songs "Jowls" and "Scapula" are both re-recorded versions of songs of the same names on Giant Robot (NTT).
 The song "Night of the Slunk" has a similar riff as "Jump Man", but longer with less distortion.
 An alternate version of the song "Revenge of the Double-Man", named "Torture Tunnel" appears on the album The 13th Scroll released in 1999 by Buckethead's side project Cobra Strike.
 "Revenge of the Double-Man" references the arcade game Sinistar.
 "Scapula" uses several samples taken from the movie The Texas Chain Saw Massacre.

Personnel 
 Buckethead — guitar (all tracks), bass guitar (tracks 1, 8 and 11)
 Les Claypool — vocals (track 3), bass (tracks 2, 3, 5, 10, 12 and 13)
 Brain — drums, percussion (tracks 2, 3, 5, 8, 10, 11, 12 and 13)
 Phonopsychograph Disk — turntables (tracks 3, 5, 8, 10, 12 and 13)
 Bootsy Collins — vocals (tracks 1, 4, 7 and 9)
 Ouiwey Collins — vocals (track 9)
 DJ Eddie Def — turntables (tracks 4 and 9)
 Max Robertson — vocals (track 11)
 The Chicken Scratch Choir — background vocals (track 3)

Production 
 Tracks 1, 8, 11 recorded at Horn of Zeus.
 Produced & mixed by Pete Scaturro & Rob Beaton.
 "Jowls" originally recorded by Howard Johnson @ Different Fur Recording
 Recording assistance on 8 by Mark Weber, on 11 by Mark Weber & Eric Ware.
 Tracks 2, 3, 5, 7, 10, 12, 13 recorded at Rancho Relaxo studios.
 Produced by Les Claypool.
 Engineered by Oz Fritz.
 Tracks 4 & 9 recorded at the Embalming Plant.
 Produced by Extrakd.
 Track 6 recorded at Orange Music.
 Produced by Bill Laswell.
 Engineered by Robert Musso.
 Additional production on tracks 1, 4 & 9 by Bootsy Collins at Bootzilla Re-hab P-form School.
 Mastered by Don E. Tyler at Precision Mastering.
 A&R direction: Warren Schummer.
 Design, illustration & photography: Dave McKean @ Hourglass.
 Cover illustration for Buckethead No. 2: Bryan Frankenseuss Theiss.
 Photographs on pgs. 3, 6, 7 & back inlay: Warren Schummer.
 3-d programming: Max MacMuffin.
 Production manager: Gina Grimes.
 Product marketing manager: Kenny Nemes.

The Ballad of Buckethead 

"The Ballad of Buckethead" was chosen to promote Monsters and Robots. It is one of the few Buckethead songs to prominently feature vocals, which are performed by Primus' Les Claypool. Drums were performed by long-time Buckethead friend (and then Primus drummer) Brain.

The song is split into three verses, with the chorus following the first and third verse. The song, as its title suggests, tells the (fictional) story of Buckethead's life, particularly his upbringing. According to Buckethead's official biography, he was raised in a chicken coop by chickens, and the lyrics to the narrative continue this theme:

A video clip using 3D models and reassembling themes from the lyrics was made by English artist Dave McKean, and gained airplay on several music related television stations.

The song was included to Primus' live set in October and November 1999, when Buckethead made stage cameos.

"The Ballad of Buckethead" features samples from the 1996 movie Sling Blade.

The music video was nominated for the "Best New Artist - Modern Rock" on Billboard's Music Video Awards.

Credits 
 Buckethead — guitar
 Les Claypool — vocals, bass
 Brain — drums
 Phonopsychograph Disk — turntables
 The Chicken Scratch Choir — background vocals

References 

1999 albums
Buckethead albums
Les Claypool albums
Albums produced by Bill Laswell
Albums with cover art by Dave McKean